Djamandioké (also spelled Djamadjoké) is a town in the south-western corner of Ivory Coast, near the border of Liberia. It is a sub-prefecture of Tabou Department in San-Pédro Region, Bas-Sassandra District. It is the southernmost sub-prefecture of the country.

Djamandioké was a commune until March 2012, when it became one of 1126 communes nationwide that were abolished.

In 2014, the population of the sub-prefecture of Djamandioké was 15,006.

Villages
The seventeen villages of the sub-prefecture of Djamandioké and their population in 2014 are:

References

Sub-prefectures of San-Pédro Region
Former communes of Ivory Coast